Raison is a South Korean brand of cigarettes, currently owned and manufactured by KT&G. Raison is one of the most popular cigarettes in South Korea. In Indonesia, this brand was produced by PT. Mandiri Maha Mulia.

Variants

export

See also

 Tobacco smoking

References

Cigarette brands